Matt Ikuvalu (born 9 November 1993) is an Australian professional rugby league footballer who plays as a er or  for the Cronulla-Sutherland Sharks in the NRL.

He previously played for the Sydney Roosters in the NRL.

Background
Ikuvalu was born in Sydney, New South Wales, Australia, and is of Tongan and European descent.

He played junior rugby league for the Gosford Kariong Storm. He later transferred to the Erina Eagles while attending Narara Valley High School.

Ikuvalu played for Manly-Warringah in the Under 20's competition, The Toyota Cup, in 2011 and 2012.

Career

2018
Ikuvalu made his first grade debut in round 13 of the 2018 NRL season against the Wests Tigers.

2019
Ikuvalu joined the Sydney Roosters in their World Club Challenge 20-8  victory over Wigan before the start of the 2019 NRL season.

2020
In round 9 of the 2020 NRL season, Ikuvalu was called into the Sydney Roosters team 15 minutes before kick off due to an injury suffered by Brett Morris in the warm up. Ikuvalu went on to score five tries in the 42-16 win over North Queensland. He became the first Sydney Roosters player since 1955 to score five tries in a game.

2021
In round 9 of the 2021 NRL season, he scored a hat-trick for the Sydney Roosters in their 31-18 loss against Parramatta.

In round 14 of the 2021 NRL season, he scored two tries in a 35-34 victory over the Gold Coast.

In round 18, he scored two tries in a 34-18 victory over North Queensland.
On 27 July, it was announced that he would be ruled out from playing for an indefinite period after suffering a syndesmosis injury.

At the conclusion of the 2021 season, Ikuvalu was released from the final year of his contract to take up a deal with the Cronulla-Sutherland Sharks, following his assistant coach at the Roosters Craig Fitzgibbon in departing the club for Cronulla-Sutherland.

2022
In round 23 of the 2022 NRL season, he scored two tries for Cronulla in a 40-6 victory over rivals Manly in the battle of the beaches game.

Statistics

NRL
 Statistics are correct as of the end of the 2022 season

References

External links

Roosters profile
NRL Profile

1993 births
Living people
Australian rugby league players
Australian sportspeople of Tongan descent
Cronulla-Sutherland Sharks players
Rugby league wingers
Rugby league centres
Rugby league players from Sydney
Sydney Roosters players
Wyong Roos players